Sectors of Islamabad are administrative divisions of Zone I and Zone II of the Islamabad Capital Territory region. The capital territory is divided into 5 zones, of which Zone I and Zone II have been designated urban development zones.

Naming & numbering

Each square shaped sector is named by combining Latin letters and numerals together. The sector letters increase north to south from A to O, while sector number increases east to west from 1 to 20. However, at present time, sectors A to I and 5 to 18 are currently open for urban development.

List of sectors 
This is a list of all planned and constructed sectors.

 Red Zone
 Pakistan Secretariat
 Diplomatic Enclave

A-sectors
 A-17, Islamabad
 A-18, Islamabad

B-sectors

 B-17, Islamabad
 B-18, Islamabad

C-sectors
 C-13, Islamabad
 C-14, Islamabad
 C-15, Islamabad
 C-16, Islamabad
 C-17, Islamabad
 C-18, Islamabad

D-sectors
 D-10, Islamabad
 D-11, Islamabad
 D-12, Islamabad
 D-13, Islamabad
 D-14, Islamabad
 D-15, Islamabad
 D-16, Islamabad
 D-17, Islamabad
 D-18, Islamabad

E-sectors

 E-7, Islamabad
 E-8, Islamabad
 E-9, Islamabad
 E-10, Islamabad
 E-11, Islamabad
 E-12, Islamabad
 E-13, Islamabad
 E-14, Islamabad
 E-15, Islamabad
 E-16, Islamabad
 E-17, Islamabad
 E-18, Islamabad

F-sectors

 F-5, Islamabad
 F-6, Islamabad
 F-7 is a sector of Islamabad. The sector is located at the foothills of Margalla Hills of Islamabad. It is well known for its markaz/commercial area named "Jinnah Super Market" which is one of the most recognized and iconic shopping areas of Islamabad. It hosts a huge number of shops, restaurants, libraries, and casual dining areas. There are the designer shops, cafes, eateries, banks, bookstores, gift and CD shops, and service facilities.  In July 2020, the first charging station was set up at one of PSO stations located in F7, Islamabad by the Federal Ministry of Energy.
 F-8, Islamabad
 F-9, Islamabad (Fatima Jinnah Park)
 F-10, Islamabad
 F-11, Islamabad
 F-12, Islamabad
 F-13, Islamabad
 F-14, Islamabad
 F-15, Islamabad
 F-16, Islamabad
 F-17, Islamabad
 F-18, Islamabad

G-sectors

 G-5, Islamabad
 G-6, Islamabad
 G-7, Islamabad
 G-8, Islamabad
 G-9, Islamabad
 G-10, Islamabad
 G-11, Islamabad
 G-12, Islamabad
 G-13, Islamabad
 G-14, Islamabad
 G-15, Islamabad
 G-16, Islamabad
 G-17, Islamabad
 G-18, Islamabad

H-sectors

 H-8, Islamabad
 H-9, Islamabad
 H-10, Islamabad
 H-11, Islamabad
 H-12, Islamabad
 H-13, Islamabad
 H-14, Islamabad
 H-15, Islamabad
 H-16, Islamabad
 H-17, Islamabad
 H-18, Islamabad

I-sectors

 I-8, Islamabad
 I-9, Islamabad
 I-10, Islamabad
 I-11, Islamabad
 I-12, Islamabad
 I-13, Islamabad
 I-14, Islamabad
 I-15, Islamabad
 I-16, Islamabad
 I-17, Islamabad
 I-18, Islamabad

See also
 Union councils of Islamabad

References